St Mary of the Angels Basilica, formerly St Mary's Church, is a basilica located in Yarra Street, Geelong, Victoria, Australia.

In 2004 it became Australia's fifth basilica, after gaining Vatican approval for the change of description.

History

The first St. Mary's church was a small wooden chapel in Yarra Street, opened on 27 November 1842.  The congregation quickly outgrew the chapel and a stone replacement was constructed in 1846.

The optimism the Victorian gold rush brought to Geelong led to plans for a cathedral-like landmark church for the city.  The architects were Dowden & Ross, and the foundation stone was laid in 1854.

However, as Geelong's boom slowed, work ceased two years later, leaving Geelong with an incomplete landmark for over a decade.

Construction was revived in 1871 when Archdeacon R. S. Downing contracted architect  TA Kelly and builder Clement Nash to continue works, which ceased in 1872 with the bulk of the nave completed.

Work on the remainder of the church, the front tower crowns, the transepts, the crossing and  spire, and apsidal chapels did not begin until 1930. The completion was based on the original design, the supervising architects being Hennessy & Hennessy of Sydney, and the builder W J Kelly of Geelong. 
 The completion of the church was celebrated in June 1937.

Architecture

See also 

 List of basilicas

References

Further reading
 Wynd, Ian, St. Mary of the Angels Basilica, 2nd edition (St. Mary of the Angels Parish), 2006
 Morrow, W.J., A chronological survey of Geelong in 1870, Investigator (Geelong Historical Society magazine), February 1970, p. 10

External links

 St Mary of the Angels Catholic Parish website

Roman Catholic churches completed in 1842
Mary of the Angels Basilica
Buildings and structures in Geelong
19th-century Roman Catholic church buildings in Australia
Roman Catholic churches in Victoria (Australia)
1842 establishments in Australia
Roman Catholic Archdiocese of Melbourne
Heritage-listed buildings in Greater Geelong